Erich Anderson (born Edward Eric Anderson; 1957) is an actor, sometimes credited as E. Erich Anderson, and is married to actress Saxon Trainor. He has starred in film and on television, and is best known for his first film role in the 1984 horror film Friday the 13th: The Final Chapter as Rob Dier. He also starred in the 1988 film Bat*21 and in the 2002 drama film Unfaithful.

Anderson's television appearances have included the series Second Chances as Bruce Christianson, thirtysomething as Billy Sidel, and Felicity as Felicity's father. He also guest starred on Melrose Place as Courtney Thorne-Smith's psychiatrist.

He has made guest appearances on such television series as Murder, She Wrote, CSI, CSI: Miami, Star Trek: The Next Generation in the Season 5 episode "Conundrum" as Commander Kieran MacDuff, and Boomtown as D.A. Ben Fisher. He also appeared in Season 3 Episode 19 of US drama House.  He also had a memorable turn as Evan, the lead character in The Outer Limits Season 2 Episode 16 "The Deprogrammers" which co-starred Brent Spiner.

Filmography

External links

American male film actors
American male television actors
Living people
Place of birth missing (living people)
1957 births